Mahdiyeh (also Romanized as Mahdīyeh) is a village in Miyan Ab Rural District, in the Central District of Shushtar County, Khuzestan Province, Iran. At the 2006 census, its population was 80, in 9 families.

References 

Populated places in Shushtar County